Pep was a brand of whole-wheat breakfast cereal produced by the Kellogg Company, and introduced in 1923, which became the first to be fortified with vitamins B and D in 1938. Pep was a long-running rival to Wheaties, and also the sponsor of Mutual Radio's The Adventures of Superman radio series. One of Pep's advertising slogans was "the Sunshine cereal".

Pep became one of the first "fortified" cereals, with an infusion of vitamins, beginning in the 1930s. Extensive advertising, from print advertisements to sponsorship of The Adventures of Superman and  the television and radio shows of Tom Corbett—Space Cadet helped keep the brand in the public's (particularly children's) consciousness. Pep was included in "variety packs" of serving-sized boxes of Kellogg's cereals. The cereal's "mildly laxative" property was routinely mentioned in print ads. Pep faded from popularity as public tastes changed, and the brand was discontinued in the late 1970s.

In-package prizes
In 1945, Kellogg inserted a prize in the form of pinback buttons into each box of Pep cereal. Pep pins included U.S. Army squadrons as well as characters from newspaper comics. There were five series of comics characters, with 18 different buttons in each set. This would make 90 buttons in the complete set, but the Superman button appeared in all five sets, because of the close association between Kellogg's Pep and the Adventures of Superman radio show. This makes a total of 86 unique comic buttons in the set. Mint condition Pep pins, as with prizes from many cereal brands, have become sought-after collectables.

References

Kellog's Pep is shown in The Highwayman.

External links
Kellogg Company History
Pep premiums tribute page

Products introduced in 1923
1970s disestablishments in the United States
Kellogg's cereals